Thibeault is a surname of French origin, a form of Theobald. People with the surname include:

Fabienne Thibeault (born 1952), Canadian singer
Glenn Thibeault (born 1969), Canadian politician
Larry Thibeault (19151977), Canadian ice hockey player
Yolande Thibeault (born 1939), Canadian journalist and politician

Other uses 
 Testa, Hurwitz & Thibeault, American law firm in Boston, MA 19732005

See also
 Thibaud (disambiguation)
Thibault (disambiguation)
 Thibaut
Thiébaut (disambiguation)
 

French-language surnames